Kroadh is a 1990 Indian Bollywood action film directed by Shashilal K. Nair. It stars Sunny Deol, Sanjay Dutt, Amrita Singh, Sonam in pivotal roles.

Plot
Inspector Vikram Shukla (Anupam Kher) lives a middle-class lifestyle in Madhavpur along with his wife and two sons, Ajay and Vijay. When a young girl goes missing and turns up dead, he finds evidence leading to an influential male named Dharamdas (Yashwant Dutt) and arrests him. But the witness turns hostile, and Dharamdas is declared not guilty. When Vikram finds out that Dharamdas is also dealing in drugs, he goes to arrest him, resulting in a physical confrontation; ends up killing his advocate brother, Karamchand; is himself arrested, tried in Court and sentenced to several years in prison. After that, Vikram's wife dies because of Dharamdas. After that, Dharamdas also escapes to Bombay. Twenty years later, Ajay (Sunny Deol) & Vijay (Sanjay Dutt) now set out for revenge for their mother's death. They go to Bombay & meet Awasthi (Paresh Rawal) & starts working for him. They loot the golds from Awasthi's rival Kumar, who is none other than Dharamdas himself & become his enemy. Now, Kumar vows to kill them & sends his goons. In this way, Ajay gets captured by the police & Vijay runs away. The court declares hang till death for Ajay. Then, one day Vijay meets Ajay in jail & Ajay suggests him to take the path of crime for searching Dharamdas, which Vijay does & soon becomes the underworld king, much to the chagrin of Kumar. Now, Kumar seeks for revenge on Vijay, he kidnaps Vijay's girlfriend Sonu (Sonam) using his men, confronts her & informs Vijay that Sonu is being raped by Awasthi. Sonu tries to escape, but ends up committing suicide. Vijay reaches there & see Awasthi in front of dead Sonu. Thinking that, Awasthi murdered her, he kills Awasthi. Meanwhile, Ajay saves the life of a politician & with the lots of efforts from a kind hearted Jailor Aslam Khan, he at last joins police force to bring Dharamdas to the law. Then, one day Ajay meets with his long lost father & both of them try to convince Vijay for leaving the crime path, but all are in veins. Kumar faces Vikram once & shoots him, but Ajay takes him to the hospital, Vijay also meets with his father. Before dying, Vikram informs his sons the actual identity of Kumar. Ajay and Vijay go after Dharamdas and find him. Dharamdas escapes, with Vijay being shot by police. Ajay then corners Dharamdas and beats him up and sprays him with gasoline. Vijay then comes and kills Dharamdas by lighting him with a match, finally avenging their mother's death. Due to his wounds, Vijay dies in his brother's hands. A police officer then arrives holding a pair of handcuffs, thus ending the story.

Cast
Sunny Deol as Ajay Shukla
Sanjay Dutt as Vijay Shukla
Amrita Singh as Matki
Sonam as Sonu
Anupam Kher as Inspector Vikram Shukla
Paresh Rawal as Awasthi
Jagdeep as Mastram
Rohini Hattangadi as Mrs. Shukla
Pallavi Joshi as Salma Khan
Anang Desai as Jailor Aslam Khan
Vikram Gokhale as Police Commissioner
Amitabh Bachchan as himself
Bharat Kapoor as Jailor
Deepak Tijori as Kumar's Henchman
Yashwant Dutt as Dharamdas / Kumar

Soundtrack

References

External links

1990s Hindi-language films
1990 films
Films scored by Laxmikant–Pyarelal
Indian gangster films